The Best Thief in the World is a comedy-drama film directed by Jacob Kornbluth starring Mary-Louise Parker. The movie was released in 2004 at the Sundance Film Festival, and it aired on Showtime on January 11, 2005.

Plot
The movie is about a kid named Izzy who lives in the New York City neighborhood of Washington Heights. His family faces a crisis after his father, Paul, suffers from a stroke. His mother, Sue, is an English teacher whose salary is only enough to pay the rent for their apartment. Izzy is trying to find ways to escape his problems by breaking into people's apartments. Izzy does not steal things from houses, instead he eats food, moves around the furniture, writes words on walls, takes showers, and burn pieces of paper. Izzy hangs out with a group of kids who are hoodlums. When Paul's medical insurance is running out, Sue decides to bring Paul back home and take care of him by herself. When Izzy tries again to break in, he gets caught when the homeowners are at home having sexual intercourse. Izzy is subsequently taken to the local police station.

Cast
 Mary-Louise Parker as Sue Zaidman
 Michael Silverman as Izzy Zaidman
 David Warshofsky as Paul Zaidman
 Audra McDonald as Ruth
 Lois Smith as Helen
 Margo Martindale as Miss Mason
 Jelani Jeffries as Robbie
 Chelsea Harkins as Amy Zaidman
 Jonah Bobo as Sam Zaidman
 Tom Bloom as Dr. Challop
 Shortee Red as Edwin "Big Edwin"
 T.J. Allen as "Dice"
 Tanya Clarke as Mary
 Wade Mylius as Harry
 Trevor Ryan Clegg as Zeke

External links

2004 films
2004 comedy-drama films
American comedy-drama films
American teen films
2000s English-language films
2000s American films